Durden Enterprises II Inc - Formally Rail Management Corporation (RMC), based in Panama City Beach, Florida, was a holding company of short line railroads in the southeastern United States.

History 

On May 26, 2005, Genesee and Wyoming (G&W) announced that it has agreed to purchase RMC's railroad operations. G&W will pay $243 million in cash and assume $1.7 million in company debt to gain control of 14 short line railroads from RMC across the southeastern United States, as of June 1, 2005. The owners of RMC would then use cash derived from the sale to purchase several radio stations, including WILN, WKMX, KDAY, and WYYX among others.

Holdings 
RMC held controlling interests in the following railroads:
AN Railway
Atlantic and Western Railway
Bay Line Railroad
Copper Basin Railway 
East Tennessee Railway
Galveston Railroad
Georgia Central Railway
Kentucky West Tennessee (KWT)
Little Rock and Western Railway
Meridian and Bigbee Railroad
Tomahawk Railway
Valdosta Railway
Western Kentucky Railway
Wilmington Terminal Railroad

References 
 Genesee and Wyoming, Inc. (May 26, 2005), Genesee & Wyoming Announces Agreement to Acquire Short Line and Port Railroads from Rail Management Corporation. Retrieved May 27, 2005.
 Trains News Wire (May 26, 2005), G&W to acquire Rail Management Corp. rail operations. Retrieved May 27, 2005.

United States railroad holding companies
Defunct companies based in Florida
Genesee & Wyoming